A localized tornado outbreak affected primarily the Dallas–Fort Worth metroplex on April 3, 2012. During the morning of April 3, a large low-pressure area and associated frontal boundaries tracked across the Southern United States. Initially, environmental conditions did not favor the development of tornadoes. However, an outflow boundary from an area of storms in Oklahoma moved southwards before stalling over the Dallas–Fort Worth area. This allowed the formation of individual supercells, which would produce numerous tornadoes in the region. Many of these tornadoes occurred in the afternoon and evening hours of the day. One of these tornadoes was an EF3 tornado which struck areas of Forney, Texas, damaging or destroying multiple homes and businesses; this tornado would be the strongest confirmed during the outbreak. However, the costliest tornado was of EF2 intensity, and struck the counties of Ellis and Dallas, causing roughly $400 million in damages and damaging or destroying hundreds of homes. The same tornado also injured 10 people, but did not cause any fatalities. Throughout the duration of the outbreak, there were 21 confirmed tornadoes, though 16 of them were rated EF0—the lowest rating on the Enhanced Fujita scale.

Along with the tornadoes, numerous hail and wind reports were received by the Storm Prediction Center (SPC) that day, though it is unclear which were directly associated with the storm complex. However, severe weather in Texas resulted in excess of $1 billion in damages, mostly due to the tornadoes. It was estimated that at least 1,100 homes in the metropolitan area were damaged in the outbreak, including at least 349 that were destroyed. Despite hitting heavily populated areas, however, no deaths were reported. However, a total of 29 injuries were confirmed.

Meteorological synopsis

A low pressure system and associated frontal boundaries tracked across the Southern Plains on April 3. The large-scale synoptics were marginal for tornadoes, hence only a slight risk of severe weather was issued by the Storm Prediction Center in Norman, Oklahoma, with large hail the primary threat and tornadoes and damaging winds secondary threats. As a result of the initially perceived low risk, only a severe thunderstorm watch was initially issued for the region at 9:20 am CDT (1420 UTC). Once the small-scale synoptics became more conducive for tornado activity, the watch was upgraded to a tornado watch for North Texas at 12:10 pm CDT (1720 UTC).

What was initially believed to be a wind and hail event from reliable models and forecast unexpectedly developed into a locally significant tornado outbreak as a result of changing mesoscale situations, concentrated on the heavily populated Dallas–Fort Worth metroplex. That development was attributed to an outflow boundary from another area of storms farther north in Oklahoma that tracked southward across the Red River and into the Metroplex where it stalled just south of the Interstate 20 corridor in the southern suburbs, allowing discrete supercells to form along the boundary. The boundary increased low-level wind shear significantly due to easterly winds, allowing for tornadoes to develop. As a result, taking advantage of the highly unstable environment that became much more highly sheared than initially forecasted with high CAPE values, the storms became much more intense than forecasted and quickly became tornadic and intense, resulting in severe damage across the region in heavily populated areas. South of the boundary, shear was much more marginal and tornadoes did not develop. Once the cells tracked eastward towards Louisiana, the atmosphere was much more stable and the cells rapidly weakened.

Confirmed tornadoes

Aftermath

The city of Kennedale was one of the first to declare itself a disaster area on April 3, 2012, just a few hours after one of the first tornados to hit the Dallas–Fort Worth metroplex area struck their town. Kennedale made the disaster declaration official on April 4, 2012. Both mayors Bryan Lankhorst of Kennedale and Robert Cluck of Arlington signed disaster declarations for their cities. These declarations paved the way for Texas Governor Rick Perry to declare Dallas, Kaufman, and Tarrant counties disaster areas on Thursday, April 5, 2012.

See also
List of North American tornadoes and tornado outbreaks
April 1994 tornado outbreak – On April 25, 1994, a tornado outbreak hit the Dallas–Fort Worth area, spawning 25 tornadoes that day and causing three deaths locally in Lancaster.
2000 Fort Worth tornado – On March 28, 2000, two tornadoes caused massive damage to downtown Fort Worth, as well as damage to the cities of Arlington and Grand Prairie.
December 2015 North American storm complex – On December 26, 2015, 12 tornadoes struck around the Dallas–Fort Worth metroplex, including a couple of devastating tornadoes striking southern Dallas County and Garland/Rowlett. Thirteen deaths were reported.
Tornado outbreak of October 20–22, 2019 – On October 20, 2019, discrete supercells spawned across North Texas producing several tornadoes, including an EF3 tornado in North Dallas and Richardson.

References

External links
Time lapse of the event's severe weather reports

04-03
2012-04-03
2012-04-03
Tornado,2012-04-03
Tornado,2012-04-03